Earth to Atlanta is a live DVD concert of the band Widespread Panic filmed at the Fabulous Fox Theater in Atlanta, GA on May 9, 2006. This 2 DVD set features the performance of the band's nationwide simulcast to 115 Regal/Edwards/United Artists cinemas nationwide. This was a companion piece to the 2006 CD release Earth To America. The DVDs were filmed in High Definition/ 5.1 surround sound. The collection features 26 songs, including live versions of “Tall Boy”, “Travelin’ Man”, “Pigeons”, “Time Zones” and “Second Skin.”

Track listing

Disc one
 From The Cradle
 Pigeons
 Solid Rock
 Ribs And Whiskey*
 Crazy
 Travelin' Man*
 Vacation*
 Gradle**
 Bust It Big**
 Don't Wanna Lose You*
 Chainsaw City*

Disc two
 Let's Get Down To Business
 Barstools and Dreamers
 Driving Song
 Second Skin***
 Driving Song
 May Your Glass Be Filled***
 Time Zones***
 Greta**
 Drums
 You Should Be Glad**
 Goodpeople**
 Tall Boy**

Extras/Encore
 None of Us Are Free*
 City of Dreams*
 Walkin' (For Your Love)*

Note:John Keane* – Guitar, Pedal SteelRandall Bramblett** – Saxophone, Vocals
Karen Freer*** – Cello

All songs are written by Widespread Panic and published by Brian Delay or Widespread Music/BMIExcept:
"From the Cradle" – written by WP and William Tonks; published by Brian Delay LLC/BMI
"Solid Rock" – written by Bob Dylan; published by Special Rider Music/ASCAP
"Travelin' Man" – written by Michael Houser; published by Door Harp Music/BMI
"Chainsaw City" – written by Jerry Joseph; published by Pampoon Publishing/BMI
"Let's Get Down to Business" – written by Vic Chesnutt; published by Ghetto Bells Music/BMI
"Second Skin" and "Time Zones" – written by WP and Jerry Joseph; published by Brian Delay
"None of Us Are Free" – written by Brenda Russell, and Cynthia Weil, Barry Mann; published by Wixen Music/Dyad Music Ltd. and Universal-Geffen Music and Rutland Road Music
"City of Dreams" – written by David Byrne; published by RZO/Index Music

Personnel

Widespread Panic
John Bell – vocals, guitar
 John "JoJo" Hermann – keyboards, vocal
John Keane – guitar, pedal steel
George McConnell – guitar, vocals
Todd Nance – drums, vocals
Domingo S. Ortiz – percussion, vocals
David Schools – bass, vocals

Special guests
Randall Bramblett** – saxophone, vocals (Courtesy of New West Records)
Kevin Hyde – trombone
Wayne Postell – trumpet
Tom Ryan – baritone sax
Karen Freer*** – cello
Reid Harris – viola
Jun-Ching Lin – violin
Elizabeth Murphy – cello
Paul Murphy – viola
Sou-Chun Su – violin

Technical
Eric Cochran – director
Blake W. Morrison – producer
Buck Williams – executive producer
Casey Bennett – executive producer
Darren Chuckry – executive producer
Bryan Walters – line producer
Chris Osterhus – editors
Don Pollard – editors
Audio Produced by Terry Manning & Widespread Panic
Music Recorded and Mix in 5.1 Surround Sound & Stereo by Gary Lux (Bennett Music Studios)
Assisted by Michael Jesmer & Jason Kemp
Mastered by Gary Lux

References

Widespread Panic video albums
2006 live albums
2006 video albums
Live video albums